The hyoepiglottic ligament is an elastic band connecting the anterior surface of the epiglottis to the upper border of the body of the hyoid bone. It is clinically important in performing direct laryngoscopy with a Macintosh laryngoscope blade; the blade tip is placed in the vallecula and moved anteriorly, which causes the hyoepiglottic ligament to pull the epiglottis anteriorly as well and thus expose the glottis.

References 

Ligaments of the head and neck